Insight is the investigative team of the British newspaper The Sunday Times; the project was begun by Clive Irving in 1963. An early investigation was into the Profumo affair. It is known for revealing in 1967 that the defector to Russia, Kim Philby, was the third man in the Cambridge Spy ring, investigating the thalidomide controversy, and revealing the secret manufacture of nuclear weapons by Israel, In 2011, it exposed the FIFA cash for votes scandal.

References

Investigative journalism
The Sunday Times (UK)